Joel Sampson Obetia (also Obita) is an Anglican bishop in Uganda: he was the sixth  Bishop of Madi-West Nile, serving from 2005 to 2016.

Obetia was consecrated a bishop on 27 November 2005, by Henry Luke Orombi, Archbishop of Uganda, at Arua.

References

Anglican bishops of Madi and West Nile
21st-century Anglican bishops in Uganda
Uganda Christian University alumni
Living people
Year of birth missing (living people)